Karegi (also Romanized as Karegī) is a village in Bahu Kalat Rural District, Dashtiari District, Chabahar County, Sistan and Baluchestan Province, Iran. At the 2006 census, its population was 111, in 23 families.

References 

Populated places in Chabahar County